Heritage Africa is Ghanaian movie which was produced and directed by Kwaw Ansah in 1989.

Plot
A young man called Kwasi Atta Bosomefi who is a public servant during the colonial period rose up to the ranks power because of his relationship with the colonial masters. He also changed his name from Kwasi Atta Bosomefi to Quincy Arthur Bosomfield abandoned his culture and heritage and adopting that of his colonial masters.

Cast
 Charles Kofi Bucknor as Quincy Arthur Bosomfield
 Ian Collier as Patrick Snyper
 Peter Whitbread as Sir Robert Guggiswood
 Anima Misa as Theresa Bosomfield
 Tommy Ebow as Keane Akroma
 Evans Oma Hunter as Francis Essien
 Martin Owusu
 Joy Otoo
 Suzan Crowley
 Pentsiwa Quansah
 Nick Simons
 David Dontoh
 Aileen Attoh
 Richard Hanson
 Joe Eyison

References

Ghanaian drama films
English-language Ghanaian films
1980s English-language films